The Book League of America, Inc. was a US  book publisher and mail order book sales club. It was established in 1930, a few years after the Book of the Month Club. Its founder was Lawrence Lamm, previously an editor at Macmillan Inc. The company was located at 100 Fifth Avenue, New York City, New York in a  office building that was constructed in 1906. It printed and  distributed a variety of volumes in the 1920s, 1930s, 1940s, and 1950s. A victim of the Great Depression, the Book League of America was purchased by Doubleday in 1936.

Products
Book League of America printed and published contemporary and classic books.  The clothbound hardcover was commonly a dark navy-blue, though sometimes red or black.  There was an embossed logo on the front.  Depending upon a variety of exposure conditions and perhaps publishing years, the spine cloth faded differently, with some of the spines remaining dark navy, while others turned purple or navy-green.  The spine featured book title and author in gold or silver gilt lettering, along with decorative scrolling, sometimes in an art deco motif.

Most of the pages were smooth-cut on the top and bottom edges, and deckle-edged on the outer edge.  Some books contained the note: "This book is standard length, complete and unabridged.  Manufactured under wartime conditions in conformity with all government regulations controlling the use of paper and other materials."  This explains the yellowed or tanning paper condition, more noticeable in some books than others.  Some books were illustrated. Many of the books did not include a publish date.  Dust jackets were not included.

Services
Approximately 5,000 subscribers received monthly fliers that offered a selection from a variety of contemporary and world classic literature choices.   
"The famous Board of Editors selects for you 2 books each month: the best new book -AND- one of the greatest classics.  The Book League of America supplies these 2 books each month at 1/3 of the usual cost!

Some books, published by other companies but carrying the Book League of America imprint, were included in the club sales offerings.  These publishers included:
 A. S. Barnes & Company, New York
 Bartholomew House, Inc., New York
 Blakiston Company, Philadelphia
 Caxton House Inc., New York
 Doubleday, Doran and Company, Inc., New York
 E. M. Hale and Company, Wisconsin
 Everybody's Vacation Publishing Company, New York
 Literary Classics Inc., New York
 Puritan Publishing Company, Chicago & Philadelphia
 William H. Wise & Co., New York

There was no membership fee to join the plan. The subscription cost $16.68 and entitled the subscriber to twelve books each year.

Partial list

A—G
 A Connecticut Yankee in King Arthur's Court, by Mark Twain, 1917
 Abe Lincoln of Pigeon Creek, by William E. Wilson, 1950
 Across the Frontiers, by Sir Philip Gibbs, 1938
 A History of New York & The Sketch Book, by Washington Irving
 Alice's Adventures in Wonderland, by Lewis Carroll, 1941
 All Night Long, a Novel of Guerilla Warfare in Russia, by Erskine Caldwell, 1942
 All that glitters, by Frances Parkinson Keyes, 1941
 Always A River, by Drayton Mayrant, 1957
 America Visited, by Dickens, Thackeray and Others; arranged by Edith I. Coombs, 1937
 Areopagitica and Other Prose Writings, by John Milton; editor William Haller, 1929
 A Tale of Two Cities & Christmas Carol & The Chimes, by Charles Dickens
 At the Sign of the Reine Pédauque, by Anatole France, 1931
 A Time Will Come, by Rachel McBrayer Varble, 1940
 A Woman is Witness, a Paris Diary, by Ernst Lothar, 1941
 Away All Boats, by Kenneth Dodson, 1954
 Ben-Hur: A Tale of the Christ, by Lew Wallace
 Bernard Shaw, by Frank Harris, 1931
 Beyond Horizons, by Lincoln Ellsworth, 1938
 Bless This House, by Norah Lofts, 1955
 Camille, by Alexandre Dumas, 1937
 Captains Courageous, by Rudyard Kipling
 Captain Of The Medici, by John J. Pugh, 1955
 Captain Lightfoot, by W.R. Burnett, 1955
 Caravan for China, by Frank Stuart, 1941
 Catch the Gold Ring, by John Stephen Strange, 1955
 Chance, a Tale in Two Parks, by Joseph Conrad, 1921
 Charlotte and Dr. James, by Guy McCrone, 1956
 Christmas Holiday, by W. Somerset Maugham
 Cimarron, by Edna Ferber
 Cities of Refuge, a Novel, by Philip Gibbs, 1937
 Comedies of Oscar Wilde, by Oscar Wilde
 Comedies of Molière, selected by John Gassner; translation by Baker & Miller, 1946
 Confessors of the Name, by Gladys Schmitt, 1953
 Conquest of Mexico, by William H. Prescott, 1934
 Conquest of Peru, by William H. Prescott
 Coromandel!, by John Masters, 1956
 Crocus, a Novel, by Neil Bell (pen name for Stephen Southwold), 1937
 Cyrano de Bergerac, by Edmond Rostand
 Dangerous Ground, by Francis Sill Wickware, 1946
 Death of a Peer, by Ngaio Marsh, 1940
 Demelza, by Winston Graham, 1953
 Devil's Bridge, by Mary Deasy, 1953
 Don Quixote, by Miguel de Cervantes; translation by Richard Emery Roberts
 Dr. Krasinski's Secret, by M. P. Shiel, 1929
 Edgar Wallace, the Biography of a Phenomenon, by Margaret Lane, 1939
 Ella Gunning, by Mary Deasy, 1951
 Emma, by F.W. Kenyon, 1956
 English Comedies, edited by John Gassner
 Essays of Ralph Waldo Emerson, by Ralph Waldo Emerson
 Excelsior!, by Paul Hyde Bonner, 1956
 False Witness, by Irving Stone, 1903
 Family Fortunes, by Gwen Davenport, 1949
 Famous French Novels, Seven Modern Condensations, editor Cameron Hyde
 Fathers and Sons, by Ivan Turgenev
 Farewell to Valley Forge, by David Taylor, 1956
 Favorite Works of Sir Walter Scott, by Sir Walter Scott, 1942
 Fetish, by Christine Garnier, 1953
 Flamenco, by Lady Eleanor Smith, 1931
 For My Great Folly, a Novel, by Thomas B. Costain, 1942
 Gladiator, by Philip Gordon Wylie, 1930
 Great Expectations, by Charles Dickens
 Great Novels of Anatole France by Anatole France, 1918
 Green Mansions, by William Henry Hudson
 Gulliver's Travels, by Jonathan Swift, 1937

H—S
 Hear This Woman, by Ben and Ann Pinchot, 1951
 Hunchback of Notre Dame, by Victor Hugo
 Intruder From The Sea, by Gordon McDonell, 1954
 Jane Eyre, by Charlotte Brontë, 1940
 Jefferson's Letters, arranged by Willson Whitman
 John Brown's Cousin, by Jane Hutchens, 1940
 Jubel's Children, by Lenard Kaufman, 1951
 Jubilee, by John Brick, 1956
 Kotto, Being Japanese Curios, by Lafcadio Hearn, 1929
 Lady Blanche Farm & Queen Anne's Lace, by Frances Parkinson Keyes, 1954
 Lavengro & the Romany Rye, by George Borrow
 Les Misérables, by Victor Hugo, 1943
 Living Biographies of Famous Novelists, by Henry Thomas & Dana Lee Thomas, 1943
 Lord Jim, by Joseph Conrad
 Lord Vanity, by Samuel Shellabarger, 1955
 Lorna Doone, a Romance of Exmoor, by Richard Blackmore
 Love in the Sun, by Leo Walmsley, 1940
 Madame Bovary, by Gustave Flaubert, 1937
 Mary Lavelle, by Kate O'Brien, 1936
 Meet Mr. Fortune, by H. C. Bailey, 1942
 Mexican Maze, by Carleton Beals, 1931 with Illustrations by Diego Rivera
 Michael Strogoff, by Jules Verne, 1940
 Mikado and Other Operas, by W. S. Gilbert, 1929
 Moby Dick, by Herman Melville, 1940
 Moonstone, by Wilkie Collins
 Nana, by Émile Zola, 1937
 O. Henry Memorial Award Prize Stories of 1941, edited by Herschell Brickell, 1941
 Plays of the Greek Dramatists, selections from Aeschylus, Sophocles, Euripides, Aristophanes
 Poems and Tales of Edgar Allan Poe, by Edgar Allan Poe
 Pride and Prejudice, by Jane Austen, 1937
 Quo Vadis, a Narrative of the Time of Nero, by Henryk Sienkiewicz; translation from the Polish by Jeremiah Curtin, 1925
 Rebecca, by Daphne du Maurier, 1938
 Road to Endor, by Esther Barstow Hammond, 1940
 Rob Roy and Selected Poems, by Sir Walter Scott
 Romola, by George Eliot
 Rubaiyat of Omar Khayam
 Samuel Pepys, by Arthur Ponsonby, 1929
 Sapho, by Alphonse Daudet, 1932
 Sara Dane, by Catherine Gaskin, 1955
 Science of Life, by H. G. Wells, Julian Huxley, G. P. Wells, 1936
 Selected Stories of Bret Harte, by Bret Harte
 Selected Writings of Thomas Paine, by Thomas Paine
 Selections from the Arabian Nights, translation by Sir Richard Burton
 Sense and Sensibility & Northanger Abbey, by Jane Austen
 Short Stories of de Maupassant, by Guy de Maupassant, 1941
Short Stories of W. Somerset Maugham, by W. Somerset Maugham
 Show Boat, by Edna Ferber, 1926
 Signed with Their Honor, by James Aldridge, 1942
 Six Famous French Novels, edited by Cameron Hyde, 1943
 So Big, by Edna Ferber
 Solomon And The Queen of Sheba, by Czenzi Ormonde, 1955
 Stephania, by Ilona Karmel, 1953

T—Z
 Tales from the Decameron, by Giovanni Boccaccio, 1930
 Tales of Mystery and Imagination, by Edgar Allan Poe, 1940
 Tender Victory, by Taylor Caldwell, 1957
 That Lofty Sky, by Henry Beetle Hough, 1941
 That None Should Die, by Frank G. Slaughter, 1941
 The Adventurers, by Ernest Haycox, 1955
 The Adventures of Baron Munchausen
 The Autobiography of Benvenuto Cellini, 1937
 The Best Known Works of Daniel Defoe, by Daniel Defoe, 1942
 The Best Known Works of Elizabeth & Robert Browning, by Robert Browning, Elizabeth Barrett Browning, 1942
 The Best Known Works of Émile Zola, by Émile Zola, 1941
 The Best Known Works of Gustave Flaubert, by Gustave Flaubert, 1941
 The Best Known Works of Ibsen, by Henrik Ibsen, 1941
 The Best Known Works of Ivan Turgenev, by Ivan Turgenev
 The Best Known Works of James Fenimore Cooper, by James Fenimore Cooper, 1942
 The Best Known Works of Nathaniel Hawthorne, by Nathaniel Hawthorne
 The Best Known Works of Oscar Wilde, by Oscar Wilde, 1940
 The Best Known Works of Ralph Waldo Emerson, by Ralph Waldo Emerson, 1941
 The Best Known Works of Robert Louis Stevenson, by Robert Louis Stevenson, 1941
 The Best Known Works of Thomas Carlyle, by Thomas Carlyle, 1942
 The Best Known Works of Voltaire, by François-Marie Arouet de Voltaire
 The Best Known Works of Washington Irving, by Washington Irving, 1942
 The Best Known Works of William Shakespeare, by William Shakespeare
 The Book of Ser Marco Polo, the Venetian, by Marco Polo, 1929
 The Chuckling Fingers, by Mabel Seeley, 1941
 The Clairvoyant, by Ernst Lothar, 1932
 The Cloister and the Hearth, by Charles Reade
 The Collected Poems of Walt Whitman, edited by Emory Holloway
 The Complete Works of Horace, edited by Casper J. Kraemer, Jr., 1938
 The Corioli Affair, by Mary Deasy, 1955
 The Count of Monte Cristo, by Alexandre Dumas, père
 The Countryman's Year, by David Grayson, 1936
 The Crime of Sylvester Bonnard, by Anatole France, 1937
 The Crime Wave at Blandings, by P. G. Wodehouse, 1937
 The Dance of Life, by Havelock Ellis, 1929
 The Death of Lord Haw Haw, by Brett Rutledge (pen name of Elliot Paul), 1940
 The Decline and Fall of the Roman Empire, by Edward Gibbon
 The Diary of Samuel Pepys, edited by Isabel Ely Lord
 The Droll Stories of Honoré de Balzac, by Honoré de Balzac
 The Education of Henry Adams, by Henry Adams, 1928
 The Egoist, a Comedy in Narrative, by George Meredith, 1941
 The Essays of Elia, by Charles Lamb, 1929
 The Favorite Works of Charles Dickens, by Charles Dickens, 1942
 The Feast, by Margaret Kennedy, 1950
 The Fool Killer, by Helen Eustis, 1954
 The Foolish Immortals, by Paul Gallico, 1954
 The 4 Georges, by William Makepeace Thackeray, 1937
 The Freeholder, by Joe David Brown, 1949
 The Gentle Kingdom of Giacomo, by Evelyn Wells, 1953
 The Gypsy In The Parlour, by Margery Sharp, 1954
 The Hangman's Whip, by Mignon G. Eberhart, 1940
 The Happy Harvest, by Jeffery Farnol, 1940
 The History of Henry Esmond, by William Makepeace Thackeray
 The History of Tom Jones, by Henry Fielding
 The Hunchback of Notre Dame, by Victor Hugo
 The King's Vixen, by Pamela Hill, 1955
 The Lady Who Came to Stay, by Robin Edgerton Spencer, 1931
 The Last Days of Pompeii, by Sir Edward Bulwer-Lytton, 1st Baron Lytton
 The Life and Letters of Benjamin Franklin, by Benjamin Franklin
 The Little Ark, by Jan DeHartog, 1954
 The Long Memory, by Howard Clewes, 1952
 The Love Books of Ovid, 1937
 The Lyric South, an Anthology of Recent Poetry from the South, by Addison Hibbard, 1929
 The Master of Ballantrae, by Robert Louis Stevenson, 1931
 The Mill on the Floss, by George Eliot, 1932
 The Mixture as Before, by W. Somerset Maugham, 1940
 The Moon and Sixpence, by W. Somerset Maugham
 The Moonstone, by Wilkie Collins
 The Origin of Species, by Charles Darwin
 The Passionate Journey, by Irving Stone, 1950
 The Peaceable Kingdom, by Ardyth Kennelly, 1950
 The Picture of Dorian Gray, by Oscar Wilde
 The Pilgrim's Progress & The Holy War, by John Bunyan
 The Plays of Anton Chekhov, by Anton Chekhov
 The Portrait of a Lady, by Henry James
 The Proud Man, by Elizabeth Linington, 1956
 The Queen's Cross, by Lawrence Schoonover, 1956
 The Red Lily, by Anatole France, 1937
 The Rest of Your Life, by Leo Cherne
 The Rifleman, by John Brick, 1953
 The Return of the Native, by Thomas Hardy, 1937
 The Salem Frigate, by John Jennings, 1946
 The Selected Works of William Makepeace Thakeray, by William Makepeace Thackeray, 1942
 The Seven that were Hanged, by Leonid Andreyev, 1931
 The Shadow Catcher, by Donald Sloan
The Sheltered Life, by Ellen Glasgow
 The Short Novels of John Steinbeck, by John Steinbeck, 1954
 The Short Stories of Guy de Maupassant, by Guy de Maupassant
 The Ship and the Shore, by Vicki Baum, 1941
 The Sundowners, by Jon Cleary, 1952
 The Temptation of St. Anthony, by Gustave Flaubert, 1936
 The Trouble in Thor, by Jo Valentine, 1954
 The Two Wives, a Tale in Four Parts, by Frank Arthur Swinnerton, 1940
 The Unvanquished, by Howard Fast, 1942
 The Velvet Doublet, by James Street, 1953
 The Vicar of Wakefield, by Oliver Goldsmith, 1939
 The Virginians, by William Makepeace Thackeray
 The Warden & Barchester Towers, by Anthony Trollope
 The Way of All Flesh, by Samuel Butler, 1937
 The Weather Tree, by Maristan Chapman, 1932
 The Woman Who Would Be Queen, by Geoffrey Bocca, 1955
 The World's Great Speeches, edited by Lewis Copeland, 1942
 The Young Elizabeth, by Jennette and Francis Letton, 1953
 They Stooped to Folly, by Ellen Glasgow, 1929
 They Tell No Tales, by Manning Coles, 1942
 Three Great Novels of Robert Louis Stevenson, by Robert Louis Stevenson
 Three Musketeers, by Alexandre Dumas, père, 1940
 Tidefall, by Thomas H. Raddall, 1954
 Time And Time Again, by James Hilton, 1955
 Tom Sawyer and Other Sketches by Clemens, by Mark Twain
 Torch For A Dark Journey, by Lionel Shapiro, 1950
 Travellers' Tales, arranged by Jay Du Bois
 Twenty Thousand Leagues Under the Sea, by Jules Verne, 1940
 Two Came By Sea, by William S. Stone, 1953
 Valley Of The Vines, by Joy Packer, 1956
 Vanity Fair: A Novel without a Hero, by William Makepeace Thackeray
 War And Peace, by Leo Tolstoy
 Wuthering Heights, by Emily Brontë, 1940
 Yonder, by Margaret Bell Houston, 1956

See also
 Books in the United States

References

External links
 Book League of America at worldcat.org
 Dzwonkoski, P. (1986). American literary publishing houses, 1900-1980. Trade and paperback. Dictionary of literary biography, v. 46. Detroit, Mich: Gale Research Co.
 Book League of America, Inc. Book League review. Garden City: The Book League of America.
 Young, A. (1920). A choice of book plates by one of America's leading artists, Art Young: offered to a select group by the Book League of America in place of the 12 books of established reputation which constitute a part of a Book League Membership. New York: Book League of America.

Book collecting
Defunct book publishing companies of the United States
Publishing companies established in 1930
Literature lists
20th-century American literature
Series of books
Companies disestablished in the 1950s
Companies based in Manhattan
Defunct companies based in New York City
Book clubs
American literature-related lists